Live at the Fillmore is an album released by Los Lonely Boys in 2005. It was recorded live on October 23, 2004, at The Fillmore in San Francisco, California.

Track listing
 "Crazy Dream" (6:40)
 "Hollywood" (6:05)
 "Man To Beat" (4:58)
 "More Than Love" (3:07)
 "Nobody Else" (4:58)
 "Dime Mi Amor" (11:26)
 "Onda" (13:08)
 "Velvet Sky" (5:39)
 "Cisco Kid" (7:26)
 "La Bamba" (3:20)
 "Real Emotions" (5:43)
 "Heaven" (6:47)

Los Lonely Boys albums
Albums recorded at the Fillmore
2005 live albums